Animal Crossing is a video game series developed by Nintendo, in which the player lives their own virtual life in a village populated with anthropomorphic animals. The game takes place in real time, reflecting the current time of day and season. The individual games have been widely praised for their uniqueness and innovative nature, which has led to the series becoming one of Nintendo's leading franchises. It was reported in 2007 that 7,000,000 units of games from the Animal Crossing series had been sold.

Games

Main series

Spin-offs

Other media

Film

Manga

Applications

Notes

References

Media
Animal Crossing media
Animal Crossing
Animal Crossing
Animal Crossing